The 1958 East Aberdeenshire by-election was held on 20 November 1958 when the incumbent Conservative MP, Sir Robert Boothby was elevated to a life peerage.  The by-election was retained by the Conservative candidate Patrick Wolrige-Gordon. Wolrige-Gordon was still an undergraduate at Oxford and at the time of his election the youngest MP.

In 1955 Boothby had won the seat with a majority of just over 10,000 votes. While that contest had been a straight fight between the Conservatives and Labour, the by-election saw the Liberal Party also field a candidate.

References

East Aberdeenshire by-election
East Aberdeenshire by-election, 1958
East Aberdeenshire by-election
Aberdeenshire, East
East Aberdeenshire by-election
20th century in Aberdeenshire
Politics of Aberdeenshire